Lisa White may refer to:

 Lisa J. White, teacher and translator of Arabic
 Lisa White (bowls), New Zealand lawn and indoor bowler
 Lisa Marie White (born 1993), Singaporean model and beauty pageant titleholder
 Lisa White (geologist), an American paleontologist and educator